Bill Delamere  (20 April 1935 – 16 February 2023) was an Australian professional rugby league footballer who played in the 1950s and 1960s. He played for Manly-Warringah in the New South Wales Rugby League (NSWRL) competition, for the New South Wales representative team and toured England, France and Italy with the 1959-60 Kangaroos Australian team.

Background
Delamere  played junior rugby league for Newport before being graded by Manly.

Playing career
Delamere made his first grade debut for Manly-Warringah in 1957. Delamere played in one of Manly's finals games against St George as they were defeated 21–7. Manly would go on to reach their second grand final against St. George. Delamere was not selected to play in the match as St George outclassed Manly to win 31–9. In 1958, Manly made the finals again but failed to reach the grand final.

In 1959, Manly reached their third grand final and once again the opponents were St George. Delamere played at prop in the grand final as St George kept Manly scoreless winning their 4th straight premiership 20–0. Delamare also received his first representative call up in 1959 being chosen to play for New South Wales.

In 1959-60 Delamere was selected to tour England, France and Italy with the Australian Kangaroos team and played in several games against club teams on that tour and two games against the Italian national team.  Delamere retired at the end of the 1964 season.

References

Manly Warringah Sea Eagles players
Rugby league props
New South Wales rugby league team players
1935 births
2023 deaths
Australia national rugby league team players
Rugby league players from Sydney